Gabrielle Medina is a fictional character from the ABC soap opera One Life to Live. The role was played by actress Fiona Hutchison, who debuted in the role February 20, 1987. Hutchison briefly reprised the role for the series finale January 6 and 9, 2012.

Storylines
Gabrielle first appears when former boyfriend Max Holden (James DePaiva) visits her native Argentina with his new girlfriend, Tina Lord (Andrea Evans), in 1987. Gabrielle's drug lord father, Dante Medina (Henry Darrow), is killed and Tina is presumed dead after plummeting over the Iguazu Falls. She turns up alive as Gabrielle secretly gives birth to Max's son; Gabrielle is soon duped by Tina into letting Tina pass the child off as her own. Gabrielle believes that Tina is raising the child with Max, but Tina actually pretends the child is hers with estranged husband Cord Roberts (John Loprieno), hoping to reconcile with him. Gabrielle moves to Llanview in July 1987, and the truth is eventually revealed, leading her to reunite with her son, Al. Max and Gabrielle fight their passionate attraction to one another after she marries his brother, Steve Holden, in 1988.

After Gabrielle and Steve divorce, she orchestrates a baby switch involving Steve's baby with fiancee Brenda McGillis (Brenda Brock) to prevent her friend Michael Grande (Dennis Parlato) from learning that his newborn son actually died; Gabrielle and Michael get engaged, but once the switch is exposed, the relationship ends. Gabrielle goes on trial but is given a slap on the wrist; she and Max reunite and marry in 1990. In 1991, mob boss Carlo Hesser (Thom Christopher) blackmails Gabrielle to aid him in his plot to poison newspaper publisher Viki Lord Buchanan (Erika Slezak). Gabrielle eventually backs out and testifies against Carlo in trial for Viki's attempted murder. She ends up accepting the blame and goes to jail for seven years to protect her young son Al from Carlo's wrath in 1991.

After her stint in Statesville Prison, Gabrielle returns to Llanview in 2001 and marries billionaire Asa Buchanan (Philip Carey) as part of her scheme to destroy Max, with whom she is angry for being a dead-beat father to Al. Gabrielle and Asa plot to fake Asa's death and frame Max for the "murder," but Gabrielle ends up falling in love with Max again. Asa catches wind of this and, suspecting Gabrielle and Max are plotting to kill him for real, decides to fake his own death without her help and frame both Gabrielle and Max for his "death." The truth is uncovered when Asa's son, Bo Buchanan (Robert S. Woods), finds him hiding out on St. Blaze's Island.

Upon his return to Llanview, Asa divorces Gabrielle, throwing her out of the mansion and leaving her with no clothes, no money, and no home. Angry with his father, Bo invites Gabrielle to live with him in his garret but demands that she find herself a job. Gabrielle overhears information with which she can blackmail Todd Manning (Roger Howarth) to give her a job as Style Editor of his newspaper, The Sun. Bo suspects foul play and demands the truth from Gabrielle. When she finally admits to her crimes, she expects that Bo will throw her out of his home, but he surprises her by asking her to stay. Gabrielle and Bo grow very close while living together, and they eventually fall in love and begin dating seriously, which allows her to become a less vindictive person.

When Bo's ex-wife, Nora Hanen (Hillary B. Smith), becomes the Assistant District Attorney, Gabrielle becomes jealous and insecure with her relationship with Bo, but he assures her that he and Nora are over. When Gabrielle learns that Matthew is really Bo's son, she keeps the truth from them both but eventually confesses to Bo. Nora is furious, but Bo forgives Gabrielle and assures her that he doesn't want to break up because of it and that he still wants Gabrielle in his life.

After Gabrielle and Bo have a fight one night, she gets drunk and is taken advantage of by Troy MacIver (Ty Treadway). Despite her insistence that it was a mistake, Troy pursues Gabrielle to the point of near stalking her. Their clandestine meetings are caught on video by Jen Rappaport (Jessica Morris), and the footage soon becomes evidence in a possible homicide. Gabrielle destroys the evidence in a panic but promises to make up for it by going undercover to expose Troy's crimes. The plan goes wrong and Troy kidnaps Gabrielle and locks her in a morgue to die. Bo comes to her rescue just in time.

Gabrielle's son, Al, soon becomes sick and in need of a liver transplant. Gabrielle offers to give part of her liver to save his life, but Al dies when the procedure fails. Grief-stricken, Gabrielle breaks off her engagement to Bo and moves out of the apartment. Bo convinces her not to give up on life, and the two resume their engagement after she moves back in. On New Year's Eve of 2003, Gabrielle is murdered by serial killer Dr. Stephen Haver (Matthew Ashford).

When Bo is shot by Troy at the series finale in 2012, Gabrielle appears to Bo from Heaven, encouraging him to stay with her in the afterlife and "pick up where they left off".

References

External links
Fiona Hutchison as Gabrielle Medina – ABC.com (archived)
Gabrielle Medina profile – SoapCentral.com

Television characters introduced in 1987
One Life to Live characters
Female characters in television